Hedong Subdistrict is a subdistrict and the seat of Shuncheng District, Fushun, Liaoning, People's Republic of China. , it has six residential communities under its administration.

See also
List of township-level divisions of Liaoning

References

Fushun
Township-level divisions of Liaoning